Mohena Singh, also known as Mohena Kumari Singh is an Indian television actress, dancer, choreographer and Youtuber. She is known for playing the role of Keerti Goenka Singhania in Star Plus's Yeh Rishta Kya Kehlata Hai.

Personal life 
On 14 October 2019, she married politician and businessman Suyesh Rawat, who is the son of Uttarakhand Cabinet Minister Satpal Maharaj. She welcomed a baby boy on 15 April 2022.

Career 
Her first television appearance was on Dance India Dance, after which she assisted Remo D’Souza as an assistant choreographer on various projects like ‘Student Of The Year’, Dedh Ishquiya, Yeh Jawani Hai Deewani. She started her acting career as Sara in Dil Dostii Dance (2015). She also worked as a choreographer in many seasons of the celebrity dance reality show, Jhalak Dikhhla Jaa. She appeared in the serial Yeh Rishta Kya Kehlata Hai. She was also seen in Silsila Pyaar Ka on Star Plus(2016). She was a contestant in 2012 on Dance India Dance, finishing in fifth place overall.  She also was a part of the YouTube channel, 'Rimorav Vlogs' along with her Yeh Rishta Kya Kehlata Hai co-stars Rishi Dev and Gaurav Wadhwa, which crossed more than 2 Million subscribers in less than 2 years. Following a split in September 2019, she started her own YouTube channel 'MOHENA VLOGS'.

Filmography

Television

Films

Music videos 
Tumhari Aarzoo by Mohit Chauhan
Gucci Volt Tum by Gippy Grewal

Awards and nominations

References

External links 

 

Indian television actresses
Actresses in Hindi television
21st-century Indian actresses
Living people
Year of birth missing (living people)